Liudaokou station is an interchange station on Line 15 and Changping line of the Beijing Subway. The station for Line 15 was opened on December 28, 2014. The station for Changping line opened on February 4, 2023.

Station Layout
The station has underground island platforms for both Line 15 and Changping line.

Exits
There are 6 exits, lettered A, B, C, D, E and F. Exits C, D and E are accessible via elevators.

Station Art
A curved wall inside the transfer channel of this station is decorated with a mural named 'Flowers Like Brocade', and the Changping line station hall and transfer node are decorated with a mural named 'Growth' that embodies 'trees and tree people'.

Gallery

References

External links

Beijing Subway stations in Haidian District